"Disengage" is a song by American deathcore band Suicide Silence. The song was released as the second single from their second album, No Time to Bleed on April 20, 2010.

Background 
Suicide Silence started and announced the production for a music video for "Disengage" on February 19, 2010,  this announcement eventually lead to the releasing of the song as a single before the video's premier. The single is released in two formats, as a blue 7" vinyl and as a digital download.  The artwork for the single was designed by Joshua Belanger.

It includes the album version of "Disengage" and a remix of the song entitled "Disengage (Big Chocolate Remix)" which was handled by Cameron "Big Chocolate" Argon.

Video
The music video for "Disengage" was recorded in Los Angeles, California and was directed by Thomas Mignone. It was originally announced that it would be released sometime in May 2010, but was not released until June with its online premiere appearing on Music Choice. The video features Suicide Silence performing in front on a blank, white background, similar to the video for the song "As the Palaces Burn" by Lamb of God.

Track listing
"Disengage" - 4:04
"Disengage (Big Chocolate Remix)" - 3:38

Personnel
Suicide Silence
 Mitch Lucker – vocals
 Mark Heylmun – lead guitar
 Chris Garza – rhythm guitar
 Dan Kenny – bass
 Alex Lopez – drums
Production
Produced by Machine
Artwork by Joshua Belanger
Music video directed by Thomas Mignone

References

2009 songs
2010 singles
Suicide Silence songs
Century Media Records singles